The Journal of Physical and Chemical Reference Data is a quarterly peer-reviewed scientific journal published by AIP Publishing on behalf of the National Institute of Standards and Technology. The objective of the journal is to provide critically evaluated physical and chemical property data, fully documented as to the original sources and the criteria used for evaluation, preferably with uncertainty analysis. The editors-in-chief are Donald R. Burgess, Jr, and Allan H. Harvey.

Abstracting and indexing  
The journal is abstracted and indexed in the Science Citation Index Expanded and Current Contents/Physical Chemical and Earth Sciences. According to the Journal Citation Reports, the journal has a 2018 impact factor of 4.684.

References

External links 
 

Chemistry journals
Physics journals
Quarterly journals
American Institute of Physics academic journals
English-language journals
Publications established in 1972